Svetlana Kuznetsova (born 1985) is an inactive Russian professional tennis player.

Svetlana Kuznetsova may also refer to:
Svetlana Kuznetsova (basketball) (born 1965), Russian basketball player
Svetlana Kuznetsova (cyclist) (born 1995), Russian cyclist